There Is a Man in Our House  or A Man in Our House ( Fi baitina rajul), is a 1961 Egyptian drama, history, romance film directed by Henry Barakat, an Egyptian film director of Lebanese origin. The film is based on a novel by an Egyptian writer, Ihsan Abdel Quddous, and stars Omar Sharif. There Is a Man in Our House is one of the Top 100 Egyptian films.

Plot 

Ibrahim is a young radical leader who lost his brother during a student demonstration that turned out to be very violent when the police decided to get involved and started to shoot anyone in their way. Unfortunately, Ibrahim's brother, a young smart boy, was shot to death in front of Ibrahim. When Ibrahim sees this, he plans to murder the prime minister as revenge, and he succeeds. After murdering the Prime Minister, Ibrahim seeks to hide in his friend's house, as he had no other choice whatsoever because the authorities were pursuing him. His presence in the house endangered the whole family because none of them had any criminal record nor any political activities. They were a simple middle-class family trying to stay away from such problems. Although his friend's parents were very peaceful and wanted to stay away from problems, they couldn’t resist helping Ibrahim. When Ibrahim entered the house and explained to his friend's family what had happened, they accepted to hide him in their house till a solution could be found. The film then wanders through much hand wringing because both men blame themselves for jeopardizing the companion's parents, sisters, and a detested cousin. A sentiment between Ibrahim and the younger sister turns into a noteworthy sub-plot. As days pass by Ibrahim falls in love with her and decides to stay in Egypt instead of running away to Europe. This caused them a lot of problems for two reasons: The first one is that they were both from Muslim families and thus it was not easy for them to show their love openly. Second, Ibrahim was conflicted between love and militancy. Eventually, he chooses to be among the resistance fighters and ends by blowing up an ammunition cache and himself in the process.

Cast 
 Omar Sharif as Ibrahim
 Rushdy Abaza as Abd El-Hamid
 Zahret El-Ola as Samia
 Hussein Riad as Zahir
 Zubaida Tharwat as Nawal
 Hassan Youssef as Mohey
 Yousuf Shaaban as Fahmi

References

External links 
 

1961 films
1960s Arabic-language films
1961 drama films
Egyptian drama films